NGC 1860 is an open cluster in the Large Magellanic Cloud in the constellation Dorado.  It was discovered in 1836 by John Herschel with an 18.7-inch reflecting telescope.

References

External links
 

1860
Dorado (constellation)
Star clusters
Large Magellanic Cloud
Open clusters